Penn Township is one of twelve townships in Jay County, Indiana, United States. As of the 2010 census, its population was 1,239 and it contained 569 housing units.

History
Penn Township was named in honor of William Penn.

The Rebecca Rankin Round Barn was listed on the National Register of Historic Places in 1993.

Geography
The streams of Brooks Creek and Haines Creek run through this township.

Cities and towns
 Pennville

Unincorporated towns
 Balbec
 Fiat

Adjacent townships
 Nottingham Township, Wells County (north)
 Jackson Township (east)
 Greene Township (southeast)
 Knox Township (south)
 Harrison Township, Blackford County (west)

Cemeteries
The township contains three cemeteries: Hillside, Maple Lawn and West Grove.

Major highways

References
 U.S. Board on Geographic Names (GNIS)
 United States Census Bureau cartographic boundary files

External links
 Indiana Township Association
 United Township Association of Indiana

Townships in Jay County, Indiana
Townships in Indiana